Guillermo Alsina Soto (born 26 April 1938) is a Spanish former swimmer. He competed in the men's 200 metre breaststroke at the 1960 Summer Olympics.

References

External links
 

1938 births
Living people
Olympic swimmers of Spain
Swimmers at the 1960 Summer Olympics
Swimmers from Barcelona
Spanish male breaststroke swimmers
Swimmers at the 1959 Mediterranean Games